Jeffrey N. Walker is an attorney and adjunct professor at the J. Reuben Clark Law School (BYU).

Walker was raised in Michigan and served an LDS mission in the Canada Montreal Mission.  He received his bachelor's degree from Western Michigan University.

Walker earned a Juris Doctor degree from the J. Reuben Clark Law School at BYU. While at BYU, he served as an articles editor of the Brigham Young University Law Review.  After law school, Walker practiced at an international law firm in Los Angeles before moving to Salt Lake City where he joined Jones Waldo, Holbrook & McDonough. Walker left Jones Waldo to become general counsel for a regional healthcare company prior to forming the law firm Holman & Walker. Holman and Walker were among the attorneys for the defense when the Foundation for Apologetic Information and Research was sued for alleged copyright infringement by Utah Lighthouse Ministries, Inc. In 2017 Walker formed the law firm, Walker Law Group, with his sons (see www.walklawgroup.com).

Walker was an owner and president of Western Architectural Services in Draper, Utah, a thematic manufacturing company (see www.western-architectural.com).  He also was one of the founders of a national watch company, Precision Time (formerly Batteries & Bands).

From 2004 to 2017, Walker was involved with the Joseph Smith Papers Project of The Church of Jesus Christ of Latter-day Saints, including as the Legal and Business Series Editor and Manager, the Associate Managing Editor and as a senior advisor. He has spoken widely on early Mormonism, including at BYU Education Week, the John Whitmer Historical Association, and the Mormon History Association. Selected published articles include Walker, The Kirtland Safety Society and the Fraud of Grandison Newell: A Legal Examination, BYU Studies Quarterly, 53:4 (winter 2016 ); Walker, Habeas Corpus in Early Nineteenth-Century Mormonism: Joseph Smith’s Legal Bulwark for Personal Freedom, BYU Studies Quarterly, 52:1 (spring 2013); Walker, Joseph Smith’s Introduction to the Law: The 1819 Hurlbut Case (Mormon Historical Studies, vol. 11, no. 1, spring 2010); Walker, John Taylor: Beyond a Poor Wayfaring Man of Grief, Champion of Liberty: John Taylor (BYU Religious Studies, Chapter 4, fall 2009); Walker, Oliver Cowdery's Legal Practice in Tiffin, Ohio, Oliver Cowdery: Days Never to be Forgotten (BYU Religious Studies, Chapter 11, fall 2009); and Walker, Mormon Land Rights in Caldwell and Daviess County and the Mormon Conflict of 1838: New Findings and New Understandings, BYU Studies Quarterly, 47:1 (2008).

In 2012, Walker was asked by The Church of Jesus Christ of Latter-day Saints to participate with the Illinois Supreme Court Historic Preservation Commission and the Abraham Lincoln Presidential Library and Museum in developing a year-long program on the Mormon involvement in the Illinois judicial system during the 1840s. This assignment led to Walker writing a script to re-create Joseph Smith's three extradition hearings. This play was performed on September 24, 2013 at the Abraham Lincoln Presidential Library and Museum's auditorium, on October 14, 2013 at the Logan Center of the Arts auditorium on the campus of the University of Chicago, on March 25, 2014 at Kingsbury Hall on the campus of the University of Utah, and at the Varsity Theater at Brigham Young University on March 26, 2014. The script and related materials were published in Walker, "Habeas Corpus and the Courts: Individual Liberties from Joseph Smith to Abraham Lincoln to Guantanamo (A Story and a Play)," (Mormon Historical Studies, vol. 15, no. 2 (2014)).

Walker co-edited Sustaining the Law: Joseph Smith Legal Encounters (2014, BYU Studies, Brigham Young University) with John W. Welch and Gordon A. Madsen. Walker co-authored Gathering to La'ie (2011, Jonathan Napela Center for Hawaiian and Pacific Studies Brigham Young University - Hawaii ) with Riley Moore Moffat and Fred E. Woods.He has managed to recover the tune of "A Poor Wayfaring Man of Grief" used by John Taylor at Carthage Jail.  He was also involved in uncovering documents that more clearly showed George M. Hinkle as a traitor to the interests of the Latter-day Saints.

Walker taught at the College of Religion, Church History and Doctrine at Brigham Young University for six years.

Walker is on the executive board and the treasurer of the Mormon Historic Sites Foundation and the managing editor of the foundation's journal, Mormon Historical Studies. Walker is also the chairman of the board of trustees for the Brigham Young Center Foundation.

His contributions to the understanding of Mormon jurisprudence were acknowledged in John W. Welch's article "Toward a Mormon Jurisprudence". Walker's article "The Trials of Christ: The Silent Defense" was published by Biblicaltheology.com.

Walker and his wife, the former Elizabeth Hepburn, are the parents of four children.

Notes

References
Joseph Smith Papers Project bio
Mormon Historic Sites Foundation bio
list of owners of manufacturing firms in Draper
"Defenders gather at conference", Church News, August 11, 2007

Latter Day Saints from Michigan
American Mormon missionaries in Canada
Brigham Young University faculty
J. Reuben Clark Law School alumni
Living people
People from Los Angeles
People from Salt Lake County, Utah
Utah lawyers
Western Michigan University alumni
Latter Day Saints from California
Latter Day Saints from Utah
Year of birth missing (living people)